Chandramukhavarman ruled Kamarupa from the Varman dynasty for the period 542–566, was son of Kamarupi King Bhutivarman and Queen Vijnanavati.

Reign
Chandramukha, who was charming as name suggests, by (possessing) all the arts as the moon (by the digits ), whom Queen Vijnanavati brought forth, as the sky did (the moon), a dispeller of (all) gloom (as the moon dispels the 
darkness).  He married Bhogavati and had successor to throne named Sthitavarman.

See also
 Mahendravarman
 Narayanavarman

References

Further reading
  
 
 
 
 
 
 
 
 
 
 
 
 

Varman dynasty
6th-century Indian monarchs